Corycus or Korykos was a town in the northwestern part of ancient Crete on the peninsula of the same name mentioned by Ptolemy. There is a passage in which Juvenal mentions a Corycian vessel which evidently belonged to this Cretan town. When the Florentine traveller Cristoforo Buondelmonti visited Crete in 1415, he found remains existing.

References

Populated places in ancient Crete
Former populated places in Greece
Ancient Greek archaeological sites in Greece
Archaeological sites in Crete